Underwater Dreams is a documentary film written, directed, and produced by Mary Mazzio. The film chronicles the story of how the sons of undocumented Mexican immigrants learned how to build underwater robots, and go up against MIT in the process.

Synopsis
Underwater Dreams is the true story of a team of undocumented Mexican high school students, who under the tutelage of two of their teachers, enter the Marine Advanced Technology Education (MATE) Center's annual International ROV competition, which is sponsored by the National Science Foundation, Marine Technology Society, NOAA Office of Ocean Exploration and NASA. The four boys from Carl Hayden High School  in Phoenix competed against college teams all across the United States including MIT.

Another film, Spare Parts about the Carl Hayden team was released January 16, 2015.  It stars George Lopez and Marisa Tomei.

References

External links
 Official movie website
 
 

2014 films
2014 documentary films
American documentary films
Documentary films about education in the United States
Documentary films about adolescence
2010s English-language films
2010s American films